Marcin Norbert Gugulski (born 25 August 1958) is a Polish politician, journalist, and intelligence analyst who served as Government Press Secretary for Prime Minister Jan Olszewski.

In his youth he was associated with the Polish anti-communist opposition and organizations like the Workers' Defence Committee.

References

1958 births
Politicians from Warsaw
Journalists from Warsaw
Polish anti-communists
Polish democracy activists
University of Warsaw alumni
Living people